Turkey participated at the 2018 Summer Youth Olympics in Buenos Aires, Argentina from 6 October to 18 October 2018.

Competitors

Source:

Archery

Turkey qualified one archer based on its performance at the 2017 World Archery Youth Championships. Later, Turkey qualified a female archer based on its performance at the 2018 European Youth Championships.

Individual

Team

Athletics

Badminton

Turkey qualified one player based on the Badminton Junior World Rankings.

Singles

Team

Beach handball

Fencing

Gymnastics

Artistic
Turkey qualified two gymnasts based on its performance at the 2018 European Junior Championship.

 Boys' artistic individual all-around - 1 quota
 Girls' artistic individual all-around - 1 quota

Judo

Individual

Team

Karate

Turkey qualified two athletes based on the rankings in the Buenos Aires 2018 Olympic Standings.

 Boys' +68 kg - Enes Bulut
 Girls' -53 kg - Damla Ocak

Modern pentathlon

Rowing

Turkey qualified one boat based on its performance at the 2017 World Junior Rowing Championships.

 Boys' pair – 2 athletes

Sailing

Turkey qualified one boat based on its performance at the 2017 World Championships.

 Girls' Techno 293+ - 1 boat

Shooting

Individual

Team

Swimming

Taekwondo

Girls

Tennis

Singles

Doubles

Weightlifting

Turkey qualified four athletes based on its performance at the 2017 World Youth Championships.

Boys

Girls

Supatchanin Khamhaeng from Thailand was disqualified after testing positive for a banned substance. She was stripped of her gold medal and Dilara Narin got the gold medal instead of the silver medal.

Wrestling

Key:
  – Victory by Fall
  – Without any points scored by the opponent
  – With point(s) scored by the opponent
  – Without any points scored by the opponent
  – With point(s) scored by the opponent

References

2018 in Turkish sport
Nations at the 2018 Summer Youth Olympics
Summer 2018